Neon Twang (stylised as NEONTWANG) is the fourth album by British indie rock band The Twang, released in 2014.

Track listing
Music and words by The Twang.

Personnel 
 Phil Etheridge – vocals
 Martin Saunders – vocals
 Jon Watkin – guitar
 Jon Simcox – guitar, programming
 Ash Sheehan – drums
 Rory Attwell – producer, recording, mixing, backing vocals (track 2), drums (tracks 2, 8), guitar (track 6), piano (track 7)
 Jeremy Cooper – mastering
 Andy Hughes – photography
 Charlotte Kelly – sleeve

References

The Twang albums
2014 albums